Andrés Felipe Reyes Ambuila (born 8 September 1999) is a Colombian professional footballer who plays as a defender for the New York Red Bulls of Major League Soccer.

Career

Atletico Nacional
Born in Puerto Tejada, Colombia, Reyes began his career in the youth ranks of his childhood club, Atlético Nacional. He quickly progressed and made his debut with the first team in a 2–0 loss against Once Caldas on 27 October 2018. He scored his first goal for the club in a 3–1 victory against Unión Magdalena in 2019.

Loan to Inter Miami
In February 2020, it was announced that Reyes had joined Inter Miami on a year long loan for their inaugural season. On 7 March 2020, Reyes made his debut for Miami, starting in a 2-1 defeat to D.C. United. Reyes missed a month of matches during the season after suffering a facial fracture against the Philadelphia Union. After appearing in 13 games in his first season, it was announced in December that the club would not be exercising his purchase option.

New York Red Bulls
On 19 January 2021, Reyes returned to Major League Soccer, signing with the New York Red Bulls. On 22 May 2021, Reyes made his debut for New York scoring the opening goal in a 3-1 loss to New England Revolution. In this match he also received two yellow cards, resulting in a first-half sending off. On 23 June 2021, Reyes scored his second goal of the season for New York in a 3-2 loss to New England Revolution. On 17 October 2021, Reyes assisted Cristian Cásseres Jr. as he scored the winning goal for Red Bulls in 1-0 victory in the Hudson River Derby over rival New York City FC.

International
Reyes was an integral member of the Colombia U20 team during the 2019 FIFA U-20 World Cup; starting in all five of Colombia's matches during the tournament as they reached the quarter-finals. He scored Colombia's lone goal in a 1–1 draw against New Zealand in the Round of 16.

Career statistics

References

1999 births
Living people
Sportspeople from Cauca Department
Colombian footballers
Colombia under-20 international footballers
Colombian expatriate footballers
Colombian expatriate sportspeople in the United States
Association football defenders
Atlético Nacional footballers
Categoría Primera A players
Inter Miami CF players
Major League Soccer players
New York Red Bulls players
New York Red Bulls II players
USL Championship players
Expatriate soccer players in the United States